Two Bavarians in the Harem is a 1957 West German comedy film directed by Joe Stöckel and starring  Stöckel, Beppo Brem and Christiane Maybach. It was one of three sequels made to the 1956 hit Two Bavarians in St. Pauli.

Cast
 Joe Stöckel as Jonathan, Schiffskoch
 Beppo Brem as Michel, Rudergänger
 Johannes Riemann as Hieronymus Walden
 Christiane Maybach as Bardame Cora
 Walter Buschhoff as Halim Pascha
 Arnim Dahl as Toni, Kathis Verlobter
 Elfie Fiegert as Ali, türkischer Schuhputzerjunge
 Helga Franck as Kathi, Waldens Enkelin
 Kurt Großkurth as Selam, Obereunuche
 Albert Hehn as Aristoteles Xylander, Privatdetektiv
 Elfie Pertramer as Lucie, Pflegerin bei Walden
 Bally Prell as Leila, die Rose der Nacht

References

Bibliography 
 Beni Eppenberger & Daniel Stapfer. Mädchen, Machos und Moneten: die unglaubliche Geschichte des SchweizerKinounternehmers Erwin C. Dietrich. Verlag Scharfe Stiefel, 2006.

External links 
 

1957 films
West German films
German comedy films
1957 comedy films
1950s German-language films
Films directed by Joe Stöckel
1950s German films